Percy Knight is an Australian former rugby league footballer who played in the 1970s and 1980s.  He played for Balmain and the Canberra Raiders in the New South Wales Rugby League (NSWRL) competition.

Background
Knight was born and raised in Condobolin, New South Wales.  In 1977, Knight represented NSW Country against a touring Great Britain side.  Knight then gained the attention of a few Sydney clubs, including Balmain, who signed him.

Playing career
Knight made his first grade debut for Balmain against Manly in Round 6 1978 at Brookvale Oval.  Knight was a part of the Balmain side which won the reserve grade premiership in 1978.  In 1980, Knight captained Balmain on occasion and the side managed to reach the Tooth Cup final against Parramatta.  In 1981, Balmain endured a horror year on the field and finished last, claiming the wooden spoon after winning only 6 games all season.  

At the end of 1982, Knight decided to join Canberra after being approached by coach Don Furner.  Knight spent 2 seasons at Canberra but struggled with injuries in his time there.  Knight retired as a player following the end of the 1984 season.

Post playing
Knight went on to become a coach for the Under 17 Canberra side and also an Indigenous worker becoming chairman of the WCC (Wiradjuri Condobolin Culture).

References

1955 births
Living people
Balmain Tigers players
Canberra Raiders players
Australian rugby league players
Country New South Wales rugby league team players
Rugby league players from New South Wales
Rugby league five-eighths
Rugby league halfbacks